Anne van Keppel (24 June 1703 – 20 October 1789) born Lady Anne Lennox, was a British court official and noble, the daughter of the 1st Duke of Richmond and Anne Brudenell. Her father Charles was an illegitimate child of King Charles II, thus making her the king's granddaughter.

Marriage and children
On 21 February 1722, she married the 2nd Earl of Albemarle at Caversham, Oxfordshire (now Berkshire), whereupon she became Countess of Albemarle. She was mother to six children:

George Keppel, 3rd Earl of Albemarle (1724–1772)
Augustus Keppel, 1st Viscount Keppel (1725–1786)
Lt.-Gen. Hon. William Keppel (1727–1782)
Rt. Rev. Hon. Frederick Keppel (1728–1777)
Lady Caroline Keppel (1734–1769), who married Robert Adair
Lady Elizabeth Keppel (1739–1768), who married Francis Russell, Marquess of Tavistock.

From 1725 to 1737, she was a Lady of the Bedchamber to Queen Caroline. Anne died in 1789 at Admiralty House aged 86.

Philanthropy 
The Countess was 'one of 21 ladies of quality and distinction' who signed a petition in 1735 calling for the establishment of the Foundling Hospital in London, UK. The petition was presented to King George II by philanthropist Thomas Coram and although it was initially rejected, it was instrumental in gaining further support for the children's home which was granted a Royal Charter in 1739.

Ancestry

References

1703 births
1789 deaths
Anne van Keppel, Countess of Albemarle
English countesses
Daughters of British dukes
Ladies of the Bedchamber
Court of George II of Great Britain